In German folklore, a drude (pl. Druden) is a kind of malevolent nocturnal spirit (an elf (Alp) or kobold or a hag) associated with nightmares, prevalent especially in Southern Germany.  Druden were said to participate in the Wild Hunt and were considered a particular class of demon in Alfonso de Spina's hierarchy. The word also came to be used as a generic term for "witch" in the 16th century (Hans Sachs).

The word is attested as Middle High German trute, 
In early modern lexicography and down to the 19th century, it was popularly associated with the word druid, without any etymological justification. 
Its actual origin is unknown. Jacob Grimm suggests derivation from a euphemistic trût  (modern traut) "dear, beloved; intimate", but cites as an alternative suggestion a relation to the valkyrie's name Þrúðr.  If so it is natural to connect the druden with the daughter of the chieftain of the gods in the Norse religion, Thor, and his wife Sif. 

The Drudenfuss (or Drudenfuß), literally "drude's foot" (also Alpfuss), is the pentagram symbol (in early usage also either a pentagram or a hexagram), believed to ward off demons, explicitly so named in Goethe's Faust (1808). The word has been in use since at least the 17th century, recorded by Justus Georg Schottelius (as drutenfusz, glossed omnis incolumitatis signum ). Its apotropaic use is well recorded for 18th- to 19th-century folk belief in Bavaria and Tyrol.

Drudenfuss is also the German name of the pentagram used as a heraldic device (alternatively Drudenkreuz "drude's cross" and  Alpfuß,  Alfenfuß "elf-foot" or Alpkreuz "elf-cross") besides the more descriptive Pentalpha or Fünfstern.
 
A Drudenstein is a pebble with a naturally formed hole in the center. In Bavaria, such pebbles were hung in rooms, on cradles or in stables to ward off nightmares, or to protect horses against matted manes or tails.

Drudenfuss is another name for mistletoe.

See also
 Incubus
 Mare (folklore)
 Succubus

References

German legendary creatures
Demons
Death deities
Witchcraft in folklore and mythology
Witchcraft in Germany
Elves
Kobolds
Hags